J-Mee Samuels (born May 20, 1987) is an American sprinter who specializes in the 100 meters. He participated for the United States at the 2007 World Championships in Athletics, running in the 100 meters and 4 × 100 metres relay.

Samuels attended Mount Tabor High School in Winston-Salem, North Carolina, where he became the National High School record holder for 100 meters in 10.08 seconds at the Russell Blunt East Coast Invitational, matching the American Junior Record set by 2004 Olympic gold medalist Justin Gatlin in 2001. He also ran a 200-meter dash time of 20.32, which was the sixth-fastest ever by a U.S. prep athlete. Samuels was named to USA Today's All-USA track team in 2005. He was also Track and Field News "High School Athlete of the Year" in 2005.

He attended the University of Arkansas and was a three-time All-American selection.

Samuels improved his 100 m personal record to 10.03 seconds in August 2010, finishing third at the Spitzenleichtathletik meet in Nottwil, Switzerland, behind Nesta Carter and Walter Dix.

Personal bests

References

External links
DyeStat profile for J-Mee Samuels
Arkansas Razorbacks bio

1987 births
Living people
American male sprinters
African-American male track and field athletes
Arkansas Razorbacks men's track and field athletes
Athletes (track and field) at the 2007 Pan American Games
Sportspeople from Winston-Salem, North Carolina
Pan American Games bronze medalists for the United States
Pan American Games medalists in athletics (track and field)
Medalists at the 2007 Pan American Games
21st-century African-American sportspeople
20th-century African-American people